Mangelia costata is a species of sea snail, a marine gastropod mollusk in the family Mangeliidae.

Description
The length of the shell varies between 1.6 mm and 12 mm.

The shell has 7 or 8 stout ribs. The whorls are without shoulder. The spire varies in length. The spire and the upper half of the body whorl are chestnut- or chocolate-color, while the lower half of the body whorl is light yellowish brown, sometimes yellowish brown with darker lineations.

Distribution
This species occurs in European waters, in the Atlantic Ocean off the Azores and in the Mediterranean Sea.

Fossils have been found in Pliocene strata of Italy and in Quaternary strata of Portugal; age range : 3.6 to 0.012 Ma

References

 Cossmann (M.), 1896 Essais de Paléoconchologie comparée (2ème livraison), p. 1–179
 de Kluijver, M.J.; Ingalsuo, S.S.; de Bruyne, R.H. (2000). Macrobenthos of the North Sea [CD-ROM]: 1. Keys to Mollusca and Brachiopoda. World Biodiversity Database CD-ROM Series. Expert Center for Taxonomic Identification (ETI): Amsterdam, The Netherlands. .
 Gofas, S.; Le Renard, J.; Bouchet, P. (2001). Mollusca, in: Costello, M.J. et al. (Ed.) (2001). European register of marine species: a check-list of the marine species in Europe and a bibliography of guides to their identification. Collection Patrimoines Naturels, 50: pp. 180–213

External links
  Tucker, J.K. 2004 Catalog of recent and fossil turrids (Mollusca: Gastropoda). Zootaxa 682:1–1295.
 MNHN, Paris: Mangelia costata
 MNHN, Paris: syntype

costata
Molluscs described in 1777